Fonscochlea is a genus of minute freshwater snails with an operculum, aquatic gastropod molluscs or micromolluscs in the family Tateidae. The genus is endemic to mound springs in the Lake Eyre supergroup of South Australia.

Species
Species within the genus Fonscochlea include:

subgenus Fonscochlea
Fonscochlea accepta Ponder, Hershler & Jenkins, 1989 - type species
Fonscochlea aquatica Ponder, Hershler & Jenkins, 1989
Fonscochlea billakalina Ponder, Hershler & Jenkins 1989
Fonscochlea conica Ponder, Hershler & Jenkins 1989
Fonscochlea variabilis Ponder, Hershler & Jenkins, 1989

subgenus Wolfgangia Ponder, Hershler & Jenkins 1989
 Fonscochlea zeidleri Ponder, Hershler & Jenkins 1989 - type species of the subgenus Wolfgangia

References

 Ponder W.F., Hershler R. & Jenkins B. (1989). An endemic radiation of hydrobiid snails from artesian springs in northern South Australia: their taxonomy, physiology, distribution and anatomy. Malacologia. 31(1): 1-140.

 
Hydrobiidae
Taxonomy articles created by Polbot
Freshwater molluscs of Oceania